Wan Weixing (1 July 1958 – 20 May 2020) was a Chinese space physicist. He was a member of the Jiusan Society. He was an academician of the Chinese Academy of Sciences (CAS).

Biography
Wan was born in Tianmen, Hubei, on July 1, 1958. After the resumption of National College Entrance Examination in 1977, he was accepted to Wuhan University, where he majored in physics. He received his master's degree from Wuhan Institute of Physics, Chinese Academy of Sciences under the supervision of academician Li Jun in 1984. In 1989, he earned his doctor's degree from the institute and joined the institute as a researcher. In 2004, the Institute of Geology and Geophysics set up the Department of Geomagnetism and Space Physics in Beijing, he became its first director. He was a delegate to the 12th National People's Congress. On March 18, 2018, he was elected a Standing Committee member of the 13th National People's Congress. On May 20, 2020, he died of an illness in Beijing, aged 62.

Honours and awards
 1995 National Science Fund for Distinguished Young Scholars
 2011 Member of the Chinese Academy of Sciences (CAS)

References

1958 births
2020 deaths
Members of the Chinese Academy of Sciences
Members of the Jiusan Society
Members of the Standing Committee of the 13th National People's Congress
People from Tianmen
Scientists from Hubei
Wuhan University alumni